Yelena Afanasyeva may refer to:
 Yelena Afanasyeva (athlete) (born 1967), Russian track and field athlete
 Yelena Afanasyeva (politician) (born 1975), Russian politician